Sharon Fae Witherspoon, Lady Jowell  (born 1956) is a British statistician, serving as Head of Policy of the Academy of Social Sciences and the Campaign for Social Science, and as a member of the Review Body on Senior Salaries of the British government. She is also Vice President for Education and Statistical Literacy of the Royal Statistical Society.

Education and career
Witherspoon went to high school in the United States, and earned a degree in sociology at an American university, before her postgraduate study of historical sociology at the London School of Economics. She worked for a market research firm before becoming a researcher at Social and Community Planning Research, which later became the National Centre for Social Research (NatCen).

At NatCen, Witherspoon was one of the initial researchers of the British Social Attitudes Survey. She worked for the Nuffield Foundation from 1996 to 2015, and was director of the foundation from 2012 until 2015. She moved to the Academy of Social Sciences in 2016.

Recognition
Witherspoon is a Fellow of the Academy of Social Sciences.
She became a Member of the Order of the British Empire in 2008. In 2011 she was awarded the President's Medal of the British Academy. In 2015, University College London gave her an honorary doctorate.

Personal life
Witherspoon married one of her collaborators on the British Social Attitudes Survey, statistician Sir Roger Jowell (as his third wife) in 1996; he died in 2011.

References

1956 births
Living people
British statisticians
Women statisticians
Fellows of the Academy of Social Sciences
Members of the Order of the British Empire
Recipients of the President's Medal (British Academy)
Wives of knights